Bugár is a surname. Notable people with the surname include:

 Béla Bugár (born 1958), Slovak politician
 Imrich Bugár (born 1955), Czechoslovak discus thrower
 Arnold Bugár (born 1971), Slovak gymnast

See also
 Bugar
 Javadiyeh-ye Bugar

Slovak-language surnames